WELL may refer to:

 WELL-FM, a radio station (88.7 FM) licensed to Waverly, Alabama, United States
 WELL-LD, a low-power television station (channel 29, virtual 45) licensed to Philadelphia, Pennsylvania, United States
 The WELL, an online virtual community
 Well equidistributed long-period linear, a pseudorandom number generator

See also
 Well (disambiguation)